Sosnowica  is a village in Parczew County, Lublin Voivodeship, in eastern Poland. It is the seat of the gmina (administrative district) called Gmina Sosnowica.

The Jewish partisan leader Chil Grynszpan was born in the town. The Jewish population of the town, which numbered 300 Jews, was eliminated during the Holocaust.

The village has a current population of 678.

References

Sosnowica